Oxalate (IUPAC: ethanedioate) is an anion with the formula C2O42−. This dianion is colorless. It occurs naturally, including in some foods. It forms a variety of salts, for example sodium oxalate (Na2C2O4), and several esters such as dimethyl oxalate (C2O4(CH3)2). It is a conjugate base of oxalic acid. At neutral pH in aqueous solution, oxalic acid converts completely to oxalate.

Relationship to oxalic acid
The dissociation of protons from oxalic acid proceeds in a stepwise manner; as for other polyprotic acids, loss of a single proton results in the monovalent hydrogenoxalate anion . A salt with this anion is sometimes called an acid oxalate, monobasic oxalate, or hydrogen oxalate. These values imply, in solutions with neutral pH, no oxalic acid and only trace amounts of hydrogen oxalate exist.

Structure
The oxalate anion exists in a nonplanar conformation where the O–C–C–O dihedrals approach 90° with approximate D2d symmetry.  When chelated to cations, oxalate adopts the planar, D2h conformation. However, in the structure of Cs2C2O4 the O–C–C–O dihedral angle is 81(1)°. Therefore, Cs2C2O4 is more closely approximated by a D2d symmetry structure because the two CO2 planes are staggered. Two structural forms of Rb2C2O4 have been identified by single-crystal X-ray diffraction: one contains a planar and the other a staggered oxalate.

The barrier to rotation about this bond is calculated to be roughly 2–6 kcal/mol for the free dianion, . Such results are consistent with the interpretation that the central carbon–carbon bond is regarded as a single bond with minimal π interactions between the two  units. This barrier to rotation about the C−C bond (which formally corresponds to the difference in energy between the planar and staggered forms) may be attributed to electrostatic interactions as unfavorable O−O repulsion is maximized in the planar form.

Occurrence in nature
Oxalate occurs in many plants, where it is synthesized by the incomplete oxidation of saccharides.

Several plant foods such as the root and/or leaves of spinach, rhubarb, and buckwheat are high in oxalic acid and can contribute to the formation of kidney stones in some individuals. Other oxalate-rich plants include fat hen ("lamb's quarters"), sorrel, and several Oxalis species. The root and/or leaves of rhubarb and buckwheat are high in oxalic acid. Other edible plants with significant concentrations of oxalate include, in decreasing order, star fruit (carambola), black pepper, parsley, poppy seed, amaranth, chard, beets, cocoa, chocolate, most nuts, most berries, fishtail palms, New Zealand spinach (Tetragonia tetragonioides), and beans.
Leaves of the tea plant (Camellia sinensis) contain among the greatest measured concentrations of oxalic acid relative to other plants. However, the drink derived by infusion in hot water typically contains only low to moderate amounts of oxalic acid due to the small mass of leaves used for brewing.

Physiological effects

Excess consumption has been linked to gout and kidney stones. Many metal ions form insoluble precipitates with oxalate, a prominent example being calcium oxalate, the primary constituent of the most common kind of kidney stones.

The highly insoluble iron(II) oxalate appears to play a major role in gout, in the nucleation and growth of the otherwise extremely soluble sodium urate. This explains why gout usually appears after age 40, when ferritin levels in blood exceed 1 μg/L . Foods high in oxalate are often avoided by people at risk of gout.

In studies with rats, calcium supplements given along with foods high in oxalic acid can cause calcium oxalate to precipitate in the gut and reduce the levels of oxalate absorbed by the body (by 97% in some cases).

Some fungi of the genus Aspergillus produce oxalic acid.

As a ligand for metal ions

Oxalate also forms coordination compounds where it is sometimes abbreviated as ox. It is commonly encountered as a bidentate ligand. When the oxalate chelates to a single metal center, it always adopts the planar conformation. As a bidentate ligand, it forms a 5-membered MC2O2 ring. An illustrative complex is potassium ferrioxalate, K3[Fe(C2O4)3]. The drug oxaliplatin exhibits improved water solubility relative to older platinum-based drugs, avoiding the dose-limiting side-effect of nephrotoxicity. Oxalic acid and oxalates can be oxidized by permanganate in an autocatalytic reaction. One of the main applications of oxalic acid is rust-removal, which arises because oxalate forms water-soluble derivatives with the ferric ion.

Excess
An excess oxalate level in the blood is termed hyperoxalemia, and high levels of oxalate in the urine is termed hyperoxaluria.

Acquired
Although unusual, consumption of oxalates (for example, the grazing of animals on oxalate-containing plants such as Bassia hyssopifolia, or human consumption of wood sorrel or, specifically in excessive quantities, black tea) may result in kidney disease or even death due to oxalate poisoning. The New England Journal of Medicine reported acute oxalate nephropathy "almost certainly due to excessive consumption of iced tea" in a 56-year-old man, who drank "sixteen 8-ounce glasses of iced tea daily" (roughly ). The authors of the paper hypothesized that acute oxalate nephropathy is an underdiagnosed cause of kidney failure and suggested thorough examination of patient dietary history in cases of unexplained kidney failure without proteinuria (an excess of protein in the urine) and with large amounts of calcium oxalate in urine sediment. Oxalobacter formigenes in the gut flora may help alleviate this.

Congenital

Primary hyperoxaluria is a rare, inherited condition, resulting in increased excretion of oxalate, with oxalate stones being common.

References

Further reading

External links 
 Oxalate.org - Oxalate content of 750+ foods from university and government sources

 
Anticoagulants
Carboxylate anions